In coding theory, the Singleton bound, named after Richard Collom Singleton, is a relatively crude upper bound on the size of an arbitrary block code  with block length , size  and minimum distance .

Statement of the bound
The minimum distance of a set  of codewords of length  is defined as 
 
The expression  represents the maximum number of possible codewords in a -ary block code of length  and minimum distance .

Then the Singleton bound states that

Proof

Now let  be an arbitrary -ary block code of minimum distance . Clearly, all codewords  are distinct. If we puncture the code by deleting the first  letters of each codeword, then all resulting codewords must still be pairwise different, since all of the original codewords in  have Hamming distance at least  from each other. Thus the size of the altered code is the same as the original code.

The newly obtained codewords each have length

and thus, there can be at most  of them. Since  was arbitrary, this bound must hold for the largest possible code with these parameters, thus:

Linear codes

so that

which is usually written as

Another simple proof follows from observing that the rows of any generator matrix in standard form have weight at most .

History
According to  the result can be found in a 1953 paper of

MDS codes

Linear block codes that achieve equality in the Singleton bound are called MDS (maximum distance separable) codes. These are often called trivial MDS codes.

In the case of binary alphabets, only trivial MDS codes exist.

Examples of non-trivial MDS codes include Reed-Solomon codes and their extended versions.

There are several ways to characterize MDS codes:

The last of these characterizations permits, by using the MacWilliams identities, an explicit formula for the complete weight distribution of an MDS code.

Arcs in projective geometry

The linear independence of the columns of a generator matrix of an MDS code permits a construction of MDS codes from objects in finite projective geometry. Let  be the finite projective space of (geometric) dimension  over the finite field . Let  be a set of points in this projective space represented with homogeneous coordinates. Form the  matrix  whose columns are the homogeneous coordinates of these points. Then,

See also
Gilbert–Varshamov bound
Plotkin bound
Hamming bound
Johnson bound
Griesmer bound

Notes

References

Further reading
 
 

Coding theory
Inequalities
Articles containing proofs